The 2010 Bryant Bulldogs football team represented Bryant University in the 2010 NCAA Division I FCS football season. The Bulldogs were led by seventh-year head coach Marty Fine and played their home games at Bulldog Stadium. They competed as a member of the Northeast Conference. They finished the season 7–4, 4–4 in NEC play to finish in a tie for second place.

Schedule

References

Bryant
Bryant Bulldogs football seasons
Bryant Bulldogs football